Humbug Mountain is one of the highest mountains in the U.S. state of Oregon to rise directly from the Pacific Ocean. The mountain is completely within Humbug Mountain State Park, and U.S. Route 101 passes by its northern base. 
Its slopes feature an old-growth temperate rainforest.
Both are part of the much longer Oregon Coast Trail. The area is popular with hikers, campers, cyclists, and whale watchers although biking and camping on the mountain itself are prohibited.

Geology
Humbug Mountain was created about 130 million years ago, in the early Cretaceous period.   
It was formed when islands in the Klamath microcontinent collided, uplifting primordial mountains composed of mostly sandstone. Ancient rivers eroded these mountains, and the sediment and sandstone was deposited on the seashore. Then, the microcontinent collided with the North American continent, uplifting Humbug Mountain in the process. Near the summit, rock outcrops of granite and sandstone can still be found.

It is considered a headland.

History 
Humbug Mountain was originally known as Me-tus by the indigenous Tututni people. When American settlers located the mountain, they initially named it Sugarloaf Mountain. In 1851 it began to be called Tichenor's Humbug when an exploring party sent by Captain William V. Tichenor, founder of Port Orford, got lost and headed north of the port instead of south. Tichenor stated that the name was chosen "to palliate their gross failure."
Since that time, Tichenor's Humbug came to be known as Humbug Mountain. The mountain has also been called Mount Franklin.

In 1934 the Civilian Conservation Corps built the first trail to the summit, however, it was destroyed in the 1962 Columbus Day Storm. An alternate trail was used until the original was reopened in 1993.

Flora and fauna

Many types of plants inhabit Humbug Mountain. The most common types of trees include tanoak, Douglas fir, big-leaf maple, Port Orford cedar, and Oregon myrtle. Spruce, alder, and western red cedar can also be found.
Smaller plants such as maidenhair ferns, wild rhododendrons, and vanilla leaf are abundant in the area. Wildflowers such as Columbia lilies, trilliums, and bleeding hearts grow in the spring. Currant, elderberries, blackberries, thimbleberries, huckleberries, and salmonberries are some of the many berries that grow on the mountain.

Birds such as varied thrushes and chickadees live on Humbug Mountain. Douglas squirrels and black-tailed deer are among the numerous mammals that inhabit the mountain.

There are many tide pools in the intertidal zone at the base of the mountain. Organisms such as jellyfish, littleneck clams, sunflower starfish, and many others can be found in these pools.
Gray whales can sometimes be seen migrating along the coast, and more rarely, humpback whales are spotted.

Trails

Many trails have been built on Humbug Mountain. The Humbug Mountain Trail climbs  to the summit. The trailhead is located in the campground at Humbug Mountain State Park. After going through a tunnel under U.S. Route 101, the trail leads through the old-growth temperate rainforest on the mountain.
It has several switchbacks. The trail to the west was originally built in 1934 by the Civilian Conservation Corps, but was washed out in the Columbus Day Storm of 1962. An alternate trail was built, which now forms a loop with the original trail. The original trail was rebuilt in 1993. Both trails are part of the much longer Oregon Coast Trail.

A fourth trail, named Recreation Trail, follows the path of the Old Coast Highway. The trail has many views of the Pacific Ocean. It eventually merges with U.S. Route 101.

Recreation
Nature study, wildlife viewing, camping, and whale watching are popular activities around the mountain. Hiking and cycling are also very popular on the trails in the area. Beachcombers, windsurfers, and scuba divers can be found on the beach and in the deep water near the mountain.

Humbug Mountain State Park, which includes all of Humbug Mountain, features a campground with over 100 campsites. The campground is located between Brush Creek and the beach. It has amenities such as showers, flush toilets, a hiker/biker camp, and an amphitheater.

References

External links 
 
 
 
 

Mountains of Oregon
Oregon Coast
Headlands of Oregon
Landforms of Curry County, Oregon
Mountains of Curry County, Oregon